Amar Demais (English: Unlimited Love) is a Portuguese telenovela broadcast and produced by TVI. It is written by Maria João Costa. The telenovela premiered on September 14, 2020 and ended on September 24, 2021. It is recorded between Lisbon and Faial Island.

Plot 
Zeca agrees to be arrested for a murder he has not committed in exchange for a large amount of money for her mother’s medical treatment. They don’t receive the money and his mother ends up dying. Zeca spends several years in jail and, when he gets out, he wants to prove his innocence, find the culprit and make up for all the lost time. Neither the family of the murdered man nor his own will make it easy for him.

Phases

Cast

References

External links

2020 telenovelas
2021 telenovelas
Portuguese telenovelas
Televisão Independente telenovelas
2020 Portuguese television series debuts
2021 Portuguese television series endings
Portuguese-language telenovelas
2020s Portuguese television series